The Pixiphone was a range of toy glockenspiels (although they were inaccurately labelled as xylophones on their packaging). The larger Pixiphones had a 'raiser-bar' which could be used to end a note abruptly, rather than letting the sound fade naturally. Although marketed as a children's toy, the Pixiphone could be tuned pitch-perfect and was very robust, resulting in many children using them at British schools for music instruction, and occasional use on professional recordings by established musicians (see "recordings" below).

Manufacturer
The Pixiphone was manufactured by Chas E. Methven Ltd, Chatham, Kent, England, and distributed by Playcraft Toys Ltd England from the 1950s to the 1970s (or possibly later).

Recordings
The Pixiphone was played by Steve Took on three Tyrannosaurus Rex albums, where it is incorrectly (or jokingly) credited as a Pixiephone.

The instrument was also used on the Badfinger song "She Came Out of the Cold" which featured on the compilation album Without You, by Jeremy Baines on the first Henry Cow album, and by Daisy Chute on the single "Lazy Daze". Ben Christophers also used one on two Marianne Faithfull songs, "Late Victorian Holocaust" and "Deep Water" on her Give My Love to London album, although again it is misspelled pixiephone in the booklet. It was also used on David Bowie's The World of David Bowie.

Similar instruments

A similar but unrelated instrument was sold as the Sooty Pixie Xylophone (Pixie with an e) in the same period.

References

Keyboard percussion instruments
Struck idiophones
Toy instruments and noisemakers